Huma Football Club is a professional football club based in Islamabad, Pakistan.

History 
Huma was founded in the 1970. In 2007 it took part in the Islamabad Division Football League. In the 2013 PFF League, Huma was drawn in the Group C. They ended up last place in their group. In the 2014 PFF League, Huma ended up second place in their Group A. After six years, it made its return to the PFF League in the 2020 edition. They defeated Jeay Laal, Lyallpur, Young Ittefaq, Wohaib in their group. The final match of the group was between the top two teams Huma and Baloch Quetta where the winner would earn promotion to the 2021 Pakistan Premier League. Both teams were undefeated in the tournament. Huma were defeated and received their first lost in the tournament and were not promoted.

In 2020 Huma made its return to the PFF National Challenge Cup after six years.

References 

Association football clubs established in 1970
1970 establishments in Pakistan
Football clubs in Pakistan
Football in Islamabad